Peter Freebody (born 12 August 1950 in Sydney) is an Australian Honorary Professorial Fellow at the University of Wollongong, Australia. Past appointments included Professorial Research Fellow with the Faculty of Education and Social Work and a core member of the CoCo Research Centre at the University of Sydney in Sydney, Australia. His research and teaching interests include literacy education, classroom interaction and quantitative and qualitative research methods. He has served on numerous Australian State and Commonwealth literacy education and assessment advisory groups. Freebody, with Allan Luke, originated the Four Resources Model of literacy education.

Personal history and career
Freebody was born on 12 August 1950 in Sydney, Australia.

He received his Bachelor of Arts (Honours 1st Class) in Education from the University of Sydney in Sydney, Australia in 1973. He received his Diploma in Education from the Sydney Teacher's College in 1973 and his Teaching Certificate from the New South Wales Department of Education in 1974. In 1980 Freebody received his PhD from the School of Education, University of Illinois at Urbana–Champaign, Illinois, U.S.A. After receiving his Diploma in Education in 1973, he taught for a year at Normanhurst Boys High School in New South Wales, Australia before taking a position as lecturer at the Center for Behavioral Studies in Education, University of New England, New South Wales from 1975–1977. He served as a research assistant at the Center for the Study of Reading at the University of Illinois from 1977–1979 and as a Visiting Research Associate at the Center for Advanced Study in the Behavioral Sciences in Stanford, California from 1979–1980.

Returning to Australia in 1981, Freebody took a position as Lecturer, and in 1985 he became a Senior Lecturer with the Department of Behavioral Studies in Education, University of New England, Armidale, New South Wales. From 1992 to 2002 he was a professor with the Faculty of Education at Griffith University in Brisbane, Queensland. In 2003 he moved to Singapore as Professor and Deputy Dean (Research) at the Centre for Research in Pedagogy and Practice, National Institute of Education (part of Nanyang Technological University). Returning to Australia in 2005, Freebody took a position as Professor in the School of Education at the University of Queensland in St. Lucia. In 2007 he accepted a Professorial Research Fellowship at the University of Sydney.

Journals and other bodies 
His work has appeared in journals such as Reading Research Quarterly, Harvard Educational Review, and the American Educational Research Journal. He has also contributed numerous invited entries in international handbooks and encyclopedias on literacy, critical literacy, and research methodology. He has served on numerous Australian state and national advisory groups in the area of literacy education, and was senior consultant on the national on-line curriculum initiative conducted by the Curriculum Corporation. He was 2015-2016 Chair of the International Literacy Association's Research Panel, and 2014 recipient of that Association's WS Gray award for contributions to literacy education internationally.

Four Resources Model
In the early 1990s, Allan Luke and Peter Freebody of Griffith University introduced the Four Resources Model in literacy education. This model seeks to reconcile the debates among Whole Language, Phonics, critical literacy and others. This model postulates that in order to be a fully literate citizen, a person needs:
 coding competence (the ability to decode text, i.e. phonics)
 semantic competence (the ability to make meaning, i.e. comprehension)
 pragmatic competence (every day, functional literacy, i.e. writing a check, reading the newspaper, filling out a job application, etc.)
 critical competence (the ability to critically select and analyze texts, i.e. avoiding scams, determining reliable sources of information, etc.)

Luke and Freebody assert that no one of these resources is sufficient by itself but that each is essential. Further, the resources are not meant to indicate a sequence of instruction. Different resources should be present in instruction in varying amounts, depending upon the needs of the students. Luke has also stated that critical competence, far from being an upper level topic, can begin to be developed in year one of education and before.

References

Suggested further reading

Austin, H., Dwyer, B. & Freebody, P. (2001). Schooling the child: the making of students in classrooms. London: Routledge-Falmer. (pp. viii+209).
Freebody, P. (1992). A socio-cultural approach: Resourcing four roles as a literacy learner. In A. Watson & A. Badenhop (Eds.), Prevention of reading failure (pp. 48–60). Sydney: Ashton-Scholastic.
Freebody, P. (2003). Qualitative Research in Education: Interaction and Practice. London: Sage Press. (pp. xiv + 234).
Freebody, P. Forrest, T. & Gunn, S. (2001) Accounting and silencing in interviews: Smooth running through the 'problem of schooling the disadvantaged'. In P. Freebody, S. Muspratt & B. Dwyer (eds.) Difference, silence, and textual practice: Studies in critical literacy. New Jersey: Hampton Press (pp. 119–151).
Freebody, P., Martin, J.R. & Maton, K. (2008).Talk, text, and knowledge in cumulative, integrated learning. Australian Journal of Language and Literacy, 31, 188–201.
Freebody, P. & Freiberg, J. (2011). Teaching and learning critical literacy: Beyond the 'show of wisdom'. In M. Kamil, P.D. Pearson, E.B. Moje, & P. Afflerbach (Eds.) International Handbook of Reading Research, International Reading Association, Mahwah, New York: Routledge. (pp. 432–453). 
Freebody, P. (2013). School knowledge in talk and writing: Taking 'when learners know' seriously. Linguistics and Education, 24, 64–74. 
Freebody, P. (2016). Critical literacy education: 'the supremely educational event.' In B.V. Street & S, May (Eds.) Encyclopedia of Language and Education: Literacies and Language Education, 3rd Edition, (pp. 1–13). Heidelberg, Germany: Springer Scientific. 
Freebody, P. (2017). Evidence and culture in the global literacy education competition - and other possibilities. In A. Lian, P. Kell, P. Black, & Lie, K-Y. (Eds.) Challenges in global learning: Dealing with education issues from an international perspective, (pp. 70–94). Cambridge, UK: Cambridge Scholars Publishing.
Freebody, P. (2019). What kind of knowledge can we use? Scoping an adequate program for literacy education. In R. Cox, S. Feez, & L. Beveridge (Eds.) The alphabetic principle and beyond: Surveying the landscape, (pp. 32–47). Newtown, NSW: Primary English Teaching Association of Australia.
Freebody, P. (2019). Being literate in 'Australian': The future can. In J. Rennie & H. Harper (Eds.) Literacy education and Indigenous Australians, (pp. 313–332). Dordrecht, Netherlands: Springer Nature.
Freebody, P. & Kindenberg, B. (2019). Critical literacy: Pedagogy, diversity, and the digital environment. In K. Alden (Ed.) Literacies and multilingualism (pp. 276–290). Stockholm, Sweden: National Centre for Swedish as an Additional Language.

External links
GoogleScholar
University of Sydney website
University of Illinois at Urbana-Champaign College of Education
CoCo Research Centre at The University of Sydney
Centre for Research in Pedagogy and Practice National Institute of Education
Center for the Study of Reading

Australian educational theorists
Academic staff of the University of Sydney
1950 births
Living people